The Oder–Spree Canal, is a canal in the east of Germany. It links the Dahme river, at Schmöckwitz in the south-eastern suburbs of Berlin, with the River Oder, at Eisenhüttenstadt. It provides an important commercial navigable connection between Berlin and the Oder, and hence Poland.

The canal has several connections to the River Spree. For a stretch of about  near Fürstenwalde the canal utilises the river as part of its route, and there is a navigable connection to the river upstream of this section, although these reaches are relatively shallow and are generally only used by leisure craft. However the principal connection is via the River Dahme, which joins the River Spree at Köpenick, to the east of the centre of Berlin.

References

Canals in Berlin
Canals in Brandenburg
Buildings and structures in Treptow-Köpenick
Federal waterways in Germany
Canals opened in 1891